Jacob "Jake" Flores (born July 22, 1978) is a retired American judoka who won a bronze medal in the flyweight (– 56 kg) division at the 1995 Pan American Games.

References

1978 births
Living people
American male judoka
Judoka at the 1995 Pan American Games
Pan American Games bronze medalists for the United States
Pan American Games medalists in judo
Medalists at the 1995 Pan American Games